On 14 January 2020, there was a major explosion at the Chemical Industries of Ethylene Oxide (IQOXE) site in Tarragona, Catalonia, Spain. Three people died, although none of the fatalities were on-site, and seven people were injured because of the explosion.

The site is operated by IQOXE, which is the only producer of ethylene oxide in Spain with an installed capacity of 140,000 tonnes per year, and 50% of this production is destined to the manufacture of glycol, one of the main raw materials for the production of PET polymers. Because of the toxic nature of the chemicals it produces, the site is covered by the Seveso-III directive.

Sequence of the disaster 
The first explosion occurred between 18:40 and 19:00  and affected an ethylene oxide tank of the company. The second one affected a transformation station of the same company. The blast was noticed within a radius of several kilometres.

Following the explosion, there was a severe fire with a large smoke plume. Thirty teams of firefighters were moved to the area. They ensured that the propylene oxide left in the tank burned in a controlled manner.

Following the explosion and the fire, a 500-metre exclusion zone was imposed; railway lines and a highway were closed. As a temporary measure, people in the area (populations of La Canonja, Vilaseca and 3 neighbourhoods of Tarragona) were confined in their homes. They were advised to keep doors and windows closed until more information would be available about the eventual toxicity of the smoke of the fire.

Two workers of the plant were killed off-site, due to a collapsing roof. A third person, Sergio Millán, 59, was killed after being struck by a steel plate, which was most likely the lid of the reactor tank, that was catapulted over a distance of 2 km due to the blast of the explosion. A video taken by a security camera shows the plate flying through the air.

The weight of the reactor lid was 800 kg. Seven employees were injured, two of them seriously due to major burns. The injured were treated in hospitals in Barcelona and Tarragona.

Toxic chemicals involved 
Ethylene oxide itself is a very hazardous substance. At room temperature it is a flammable, carcinogenic, mutagenic, irritating, and anaesthetic gas. It is used for making many consumer products as well as non-consumer chemicals and intermediates. These products include detergents, thickeners, solvents, plastics, and various organic chemicals. As such, it is a vital raw material with diverse applications.

IQOXE as a part of the Seveso Directive 
Seveso III Directive (2012/18/EU) (full title: Directive 2012/18/EU of the European Parliament and of the Council of 4 July 2012 on the control of major-accident hazards involving dangerous substances, amending and subsequently repealing Council Directive 96/82/EC Text with EEA relevance) is a European Union directive aimed at controlling major chemical accident hazards. Seveso III is implemented in national legislation and is enforced by national chemical safety authorities. Establishments covered by Seveso are split into two categories: Lower-tier and Upper-tier.

The IQOXE site is classified as an ‘upper tier’ establishment under the Seveso Directive (2012/18/EU), meaning they have to comply with the strictest safety regime required by the Directive. The establishment is listed in the  database (electronic Seveso Plant Information Retrieval System.

Article 20 (Inspections) of the Seveso Directive states that, for upper tier Seveso establishments (the biggest plants subjected to the strictest safety regime), the period between two consecutive inspections /site visits shall not exceed one year.

References

External links 
Seveso-III Directive
IQOXE - Industrias Químicas del Óxido de Etileno
EUROPA - eSPIRS Dashboard - European Commission

2020 disasters in Spain
2020 in Catalonia
Chemical plant explosions
Explosions in 2020
Explosions in Catalonia
January 2020 events in Spain
Tarragona